Zell may refer to:

Places

Austria
 Zell am See, in Salzburg state
 Zell am Ziller, in Tyrol
 Zell, Carinthia, in Carinthia
 in Upper Austria:
 Bad Zell
 Zell am Moos
 Zell an der Pram
 Zell am Pettenfirst

Germany
 Zell im Fichtelgebirge, in the district of Hof, Bavaria, formerly Zell, Upper Franconia
 Zell am Harmersbach, in Baden-Württemberg
 Zell unter Aichelberg, in Baden-Württemberg
 The former name of St. Ulrich im Schwarzwald, in Baden-Württemberg
 Zell im Wiesental, in Baden-Württemberg
 Zell am Main, in the district of Würzburg, Bavaria
 Zell, Upper Palatinate, in the district of Cham, Bavaria
 Zell (Mosel), in Rhineland-Palatinate
 Zell (Verbandsgemeinde), a collective municipality in Cochem-Zell, Rhineland-Palatinate
 Zell, an Ortsteil of Bad König

Switzerland
 Zell, Lucerne
 Zell, Zurich

United States
 Zell, Missouri
 Zell, South Dakota

People
 Christian Zell (c. 1683 – 1763), German harpsichord maker
 Marc Zell (born 1953), American-Israeli attorney and chairman of Republicans Overseas Israel
 Matthäus Zell (1477–1548), Lutheran theologian and reformer
 Sam Zell (born 1941), American business magnate
 Zell Miller (1932–2018), American politician

Other
 ZELL, zero-length launch system for aircraft 
 Zell Dincht, a character in the video game Final Fantasy VIII
 Baron Garr von Zell, a character in the video game The Beast Within: A Gabriel Knight Mystery

See also 
 Zel (disambiguation)
 Zelle (disambiguation)